Tracy Lee (born Lee Mei Leng on 19 June 1985) is a Malaysian former actress and television host based in Singapore. She began work as a full-time actress at Mediacorp in 2008, following success as a contestant on Star Search 2007. In 2016, she retired from the entertainment industry, after her decision not to renew her contract with MediaCorp.

Career
Tracy Lee was a contestant on Star Search 2007, reaching the semi-final of the talent search competition. Her appearance on the program earned Lee contract with MediaCorp in 2008  and began her acting career on the TV series The Thin Line. Following this the actress was cast in multiple roles including the police procedural drama C.L.I.F., alongside her former Star Search 2007 co-star (and season winner) Andie Chen.

Lee was nominated for the Star Award for the Top 10 Most Popular Female Artistes between 2013 and 2015, and was one of the hosts of The Sheng Shiong Show, for outdoor cooking, being replaced by Seraph Sun. 

In 2016, Lee decided not to renew her contract with MediaCorp and left the entertainment industry.

Personal life

Tracy Lee was educated at Tsun Jin High School, Yishun Junior College and studied accountancy at HELP University College and the University of East London. In 2017, Lee married Ben Goi, son of Singapore's 'Popiah King' Sam Goi, the chairman of Tee Yih Jia Food. On 10 May 2018 the couple gave birth to their first child, a boy they named Ben Junior.

On 3 February 2019, her husband Ben Goi died from a stroke caused by a brain haemorrhage. He was cremated on 7 February 2019.

Filmography

Awards and nominations

References

External links
Profile on xin.msn.com

Living people
1985 births
Malaysian people of Chinese descent
People from Kuala Lumpur
Singaporean television actresses
Malaysian television actresses
Alumni of the University of East London
Malaysian people of Cantonese descent
21st-century Malaysian actresses